Emiliania may refer to:

 Emiliania (coccolithophore) (Hay & Mohler) - A coccolithophore described in 1967
 Emiliania (bivalve) (Sánchez) - A bivalve described in 1999 by Sánchez, renamed Emiliodonta in 2010